Eltun Turabov (born on 18 February 1997) is an Azerbaijani professional footballer who plays as a midfielder for Sumgayit in the Azerbaijan Premier League.

Career

Club
On 26 July 2019, Sabah was announced that Turabov had joined Albanian club Bylis on a season-long loan deal. He made his professional debut for Bylis in the Albanian Superliga on 24 August 2019, starting in the away match against Teuta.

On 20 August 2020, Turabov joined Sumgayit FK on a season-long loan deal.

References

External links
 
 

1997 births
Living people
Footballers from Baku
Association football defenders
Azerbaijani footballers
Azerbaijan under-21 international footballers
Azerbaijan youth international footballers
Qarabağ FK players
Sabah FC (Azerbaijan) players
KF Bylis Ballsh players
Sumgayit FK players
Azerbaijan Premier League players
Kategoria Superiore players
Azerbaijani expatriate footballers
Expatriate footballers in Albania
Azerbaijani expatriate sportspeople in Albania